A wall and crown knot is a decorative kind of rope button. The original use of the knot was to put at the end of the ropes on either side of a gangway leading onto a ship as stoppers.

A wall and crown knot consists of a wall knot and a crown knot with doubled strands..The strands of the wall knot go over, under twice, and over, while the strands of the crown knot go under, over twice, and under. In the wall and crown knot they are tied in opposite directions.

This knot is often confused with a Turk's head knot, as both knots have a basket weave pattern.

A Manrope knot(Double wall and crown, #847) is same knot as wall and crown knot but with little changes - crown strands doubled or tripled. in Verrill's book it is made from three-strand and crown strands doubled, in Ashley's book it is made from four-strand and crown strands tripled.

A crown knot is a simplest of the fancy knots is known. Created from three strand. Recommended for finishing off an eye seizing

A wall knot  is a simplest as crown knot but reversed

References

Knob knots

See also
List of knots
Eye splice
Underwriter's knot — two-strand wall knot

External links
"Manrope Knot", Marinews.com. Accessed: March 2013.

Decorative knots
Stopper knots